Antonio Urcelay (born 1952) was Chairman of the Board, Chief Executive Officer and member of the Global Product Safety Policy Committee board of Toys "R" Us Inc. He retired from the company in June 2015.

Toys "R" Us Inc.
Urcelay became CEO of Toys "R" Us in October 2013, and became Chairman a month later.

Career
Antonio Urcelay worked in the consumer packaged goods and retail industry before taking up his position at Toys "R" Us.  He was Managing Director for Leche Pascual S.A., head of the Spanish division of a dairy company and a member of the Board of Directors for the Ashley Group – the parent company of the above-mentioned dairy company. He also held a variety of top executive positions at Royal Ahold, being the Spanish market's Managing Director.  Urcelay was also marketing manager at Procter & Gamble's Spanish subsidiary.

At the beginning of his career, Urcelay practiced law for five years at Cremades, ultimately becoming Partner.

Education
Antonio Urcelay received a Juris Doctor from the Madrid-Complutense University in 1984.

Compensation
Antonio Urcelay's compensation for the end of December 2013: Salary and Bonus: $1,389,685 , Stock Awards, $416,680, Option Awards, $1,198,963. In addition, in 2014, he was ranked by NJBiz as Number 72 in "The 100 Most Powerful People in New Jersey Business."

References

Further reading
 A los mandos de Toys R Us in Cinco Días, of Madrid, on  May 17, 2013
 Urcelay, el español al frente de Toys R Us, gana 16 millones en dos años in Cinco Días, of Madrid, on March 29, 2015 
 Antonio Urcelay sale de Toys R Us tras 19 años in Cinco Días, of Madrid, on June 3, 2015 
 Toys R Us names CEO by Joan Verdon, in The Record, of Woodland Park, New Jersey, on October 16, 2013  
 New Toys "R" Us CEO Reveals 'Diagnosis,' Treatment Plan For Ailing Chain in Forbes, on March 27, 2014
 Toys 'R' Us CEO Sets Revamp Plan to Return to Profitability by Suzanne Kampner, in The Wall Street Journal on March 26, 2014

1952 births
American business executives
Living people
Complutense University of Madrid alumni
Place of birth missing (living people)